William Robert Baker (born November 29, 1956) is an American former professional ice hockey defenseman who played 143 regular season games in the National Hockey League (NHL) for the Montreal Canadiens, Colorado Rockies, St. Louis Blues and New York Rangers between 1980 and 1983.

Playing career

College career
Bill Baker attended the University of Minnesota and was team captain for the 1978-1979 season. He was originally selected 54th overall by the Montreal Canadiens in the 1976 NHL Entry Draft. 
Baker is best known for being a member of the Miracle on Ice 1980 U.S. Olympic Hockey Team that won the Gold Medal in Lake Placid, NY. Specifically, he is known for scoring the tying goal as the extra skater in the final minute forcing a 2–2 tie with Sweden in the opening game.  This tie allowed the team to eventually advance to the medal round.  Baker's jersey from the famed "Miracle On Ice" is on display at the Smithsonian in Washington, D.C., U.S. along with a stick autographed by all the members of the team.

Professional career
He joined the Canadiens after the Olympics, and was later traded to the Colorado Rockies in 1981. He also played for Team USA at the 1981 Ice Hockey World Championship and 1981 Canada Cup tournaments. Colorado later traded him to the St. Louis Blues in exchange for Joe Micheletti and Dick Lamby. Baker spent the full 1982–83 season with the New York Rangers. He spent the 1983-84 season in the CHL playing for the eventual league championships, the Tulsa Oilers coached by Tom Webster. He played 59 regular season games for Tulsa Oilers, but was not with team during post-season.

Awards and achievements

 CHL Adams Cup: 1984 (Tulsa Oilers)

International play
 1980 Winter Olympics, Lake Placid, NY
 Ice Hockey World Championships, 1979 and 1981
 1981 Canada Cup

In popular culture
In a 1981 TV movie about the gold medal-winning hockey team entitled Miracle on Ice, Baker is played by David Wallace.

In the 2004 Disney film Miracle, he is portrayed by Nick Postle.

Career statistics

Regular season and playoffs

International

References

External links

Bill Baker's bio at hockeydraftcentral

1956 births
1980 US Olympic ice hockey team
AHCA Division I men's ice hockey All-Americans
American men's ice hockey defensemen
Colorado Rockies (NHL) players
Fort Worth Texans players
Ice hockey players from Minnesota
Ice hockey players at the 1980 Winter Olympics
Living people
Medalists at the 1980 Winter Olympics
Minnesota Golden Gophers men's ice hockey players
Montreal Canadiens draft picks
Montreal Canadiens players
New England Whalers draft picks
New York Rangers players
Nova Scotia Voyageurs players
Olympic gold medalists for the United States in ice hockey
Sportspeople from Grand Rapids, Minnesota
St. Louis Blues players
Tulsa Oilers (1964–1984) players
NCAA men's ice hockey national champions